Graeme Rowland Base (born 6 April 1958) is a British-Australian author and artist of picture books. He is perhaps best known for his second book, Animalia published in 1986, and third book The Eleventh Hour which was released in 1989.

Background
He was born in Amersham, England, but moved to Australia with his family at the age of eight and has lived there ever since. He attended Box Hill High School and Melbourne High School in Melbourne, and then studied a Diploma of Art (Graphic Design) for three years at Swinburne University of Technology at Prahran.

He worked in advertising for two years and then began illustrating children's books, gradually moving to authoring them as well. His first book, My Grandma lived in Gooligulch, was accepted by the first publisher he sent it to.

Base resides in Melbourne with his wife Robyn and has three children.

Work 
 Susan Burke's The Island Bike Business (Co-illustrator with Betty Greenhatch, 1982)
 My Grandma Lived in Gooligulch (1983)
 Jan Anderson's The Days of the Dinosaurs (Illustrator, 1985)
 Animalia (1986)
 Maureen Stewart's Creation Myths (Illustrator, 1987)
 Lewis Carroll's Jabberwocky (Illustrator, 1987)
 Maureen Stewart's Creation Stories (Illustrator, 1988)
 The Eleventh Hour (1989)
 The Sign of the Seahorse (1992)
 The Discovery of Dragons (1996)
 Lewis Carroll's Jabberwocky: A Book of Brillig Dioramas (Illustrator, 1996)
 The Worst Band in the Universe (1999)
 The Waterhole (2001)
 Truck Dogs (2003)
 Jungle Drums (2004)
 Uno's Garden (2006)
 The Discovery of Dragons: New Research Revealed (2007) 
 Enigma (2008)
 Julie Watts' The Art of Graeme Base (Illustrator, 2008)
 The Legend of the Golden Snail (2010)
 The Jewel Fish of Karnak (2011)
 Little Elephants (2012)
 The Gallant Captain (Co-director, with Katrina Mathers, 2013)
 My First Animalia (2013)
 Breather (Graphic novel co-author, 2013)
 The Last King of Angkor Wat (2014)
 Eye to Eye (2015)
 Little Bug Books (A series of six toddlers' books; 2014, 2016)
 The Amazing Monster Detectoscope (2017)
 Bumblebunnies (A series of four picture books; 2018–20)
 Moonfish (2019)
 The Tree (2020)

The Eleventh Hour: A Curious Mystery was re-released five years later in 1993 with a new, special sealed section in the back called "The Inside Story".  Labelled "TOP SECRET", it carries the paragraph: Within lies the solution to the Curious Mystery of The Eleventh Hour, as well as detailed explanations of all the clues and puzzles in the illustrations. Do not turn this page until you have tried your hardest to unravel the Mystery – for the getting of wisdom is no match for the thrill of the chase, and those who choose the longer road shall reap their reward! — Graeme Base

Graeme's first (and to date only) novel, Truck Dogs (A Novel in Four Bites), has been released in paperback as well as a hardcover edition that includes sixteen colour plates of profiles of the characters (each half-dog, half-vehicle), depicting them as they would have appeared in the abandoned picture book, before Graeme decided to instead release the story as a novel for teenagers and younger readers.

Colouring books based on Animalia and The Waterhole were published in 2002 and 2004 respectively.  A series of jigsaw puzzles were created for selected illustrations from Animalia and a number of wall calendars based on Graeme's works were published throughout the 1990s and early 2000s.  In 1987, fans saw Viking's publication of The Animalia Wall Frieze, a giant frieze over 26 feet (or 8 metres) long, in four folded sections, in a special pack which included 'The ANIMALIA Riddle Sheet' (with provided answers) as an added bonus.

Adaptations of Base's works
 The Sign of the Seahorse was adapted as an opera with the Melbourne Symphony Orchestra in 2001.
 An exhibition was created based on The Water Hole and displayed at the National Museum of Australia.
 My Grandma Lived in Gooligulch was adapted as a play by Gooligulch Productions.  The play premiered at the Chookahs! Kids Festival (Melbourne) in 2006 and is touring country areas in Victoria, NSW and Queensland.
 Animalia has been made into a television series (Animalia), and also is one of the most sold books around the world. Base was an executive producer for the series, and also composed the opening theme music with Yuri Worontschak.
 Animalia was made into an iPhone and iPad app in 2010. Published on the iTunes app store by AppBooks and produced by The Base Factory. An iPhone app based on Jungle Drums was released by Inyerpocket in 2008.
 Between Boxing Day 2012 and April 2013, Sand Sculpting Australia held their annual exhibition in Frankston, Victoria called "Under the Sea" and included a sculpture based on Graeme's book The Sign of the Seahorse.  Their 2013–14 exhibition, "Storyland", was themed on various children's book titles, television shows, and other media, and included a sculpture based on The Discovery of Dragons.

Awards
Animalia – 1987 Children's Book Council of Australia (CBCA) Picture Book of the Year Honour book
The Eleventh Hour – 1989 CBCA Picture Book of the Year Joint winner
1998 Dromkeen Medal
TruckDogs: A novel in four bites – 2004 CBCA Book of the Year: Younger Readers
Uno's Garden – 2007 Green Book Award: Picture Book

References

External links

 Graeme Base Official website
 Author Profile at Penguin Australia, including list of Graeme Base's awards
 Trailer for the upcoming Animalia animated television series 
 Video: Graeme Base discusses writing and illustrating children's books
 Interview with Graeme Base, A DISCUSSION WITH National Authors on Tour TV Series, Episode #28 (1992)
 Graeme Base's YouTube Channel, including a demonstration of his Animalia iPad application and the Augmented Reality feature of The Legend of the Golden Snail
 The Gallant Captain film site
 Graeme Base Sand Sculptures in Frankston, an article by Penguin Teachers' Academy
 Sand Sculpting Australia's Leader Kids Day Out 2013 Facebook promo
 Photograph of sand sculpture based upon The Discovery of Dragons

1958 births
Living people
Australian illustrators
Australian children's writers
English emigrants to Australia
English illustrators
English children's writers
Swinburne University of Technology alumni
Writers who illustrated their own writing
People from Amersham
People educated at Melbourne High School
Writers from Melbourne
20th-century Australian writers
21st-century Australian writers